Cigaritis dufranei is a butterfly in the family Lycaenidae. It is found in southern Cameroon, the Republic of the Congo and the Democratic Republic of the Congo (Haut-Zaire and Kivu).

References

Butterflies described in 1991
Cigaritis